Bù Xiè ( "Disdain") is Taiwanese Mandopop artist Alien Huang's (aka Xiao Gui 小鬼) Mandarin solo debut EP album. It was released on 17 July 2009 by Rock Records. A second edition, Disdain (Limited Edition) (不屑 限量版) on 16 September 2009 with a bonus DVD containing two music videos and behind-the-scene footage.

In this EP Alien collaborated with label mates, rock band Fun4 (小樂團). The tracks "鬼混" (Fooling Around) was previously released in 2008 as a promotional single with Alien's second illustration book "鬼怒穿", and together with "鬼打牆" (Demon Walls) are rock tracks. The title track "不屑" (Disdain) is a rock ballad.

Track listing
 "Intro"
 "鬼打牆" (Demon Walls)
 "不屑" (Disdain)
 "鬼混" (Fooling Around)
 "Outro"

Bonus DVD
 "鬼打牆" (Demon Walls) MV
 "不屑" (Disdain) MV
 Exclusive Xiao Gui behind-the-scene footage (獨家側拍鬼靈精怪全紀錄)

References

External links
  Rock Records Disdain (Limited Edition) album info

2009 debut EPs
Alien Huang albums
Mandopop EPs